Jan Gunnarsson was the defending champion but lost in the semifinals to Karel Nováček.

Brad Gilbert won in the final 3–6, 6–3, 7–5, 6–0 against Nováček.

Seeds

  Brad Gilbert (champion)
  Tim Mayotte (first round)
  Milan Šrejber (first round)
  Tim Wilkison (first round)
  Slobodan Živojinović (first round)
  Jonas Svensson (semifinals)
  Paolo Canè (first round)
  Peter Lundgren (first round)

Draw

Final

Section 1

Section 2

External links
 ATP main draw

Singles